Adlington is a civil parish in Cheshire East, England. It contains 50 buildings that are recorded in the National Heritage List for England as designated listed buildings. Of these, one is listed at Grade I, the highest grade, two are listed at Grade II*, the middle grade, and the others are at Grade II.  The major building in the parish is Adlington Hall; the hall and 15 associated structures are listed.  Running through the parish is the Macclesfield Canal; eight bridges crossing the canal and three with structures are listed.  Apart from the village of Adlington and the grounds of Adlington Hall, the parish is rural, and most of the other listed buildings are houses, cottages, farmhouses and farm buildings.  The other listed buildings are a public house, a milestone, and a boundary stone.

Key

Buildings

See also
Listed buildings in Hazel Grove and Bramhall
Listed buildings in Poynton with Worth
Listed buildings in Pott Shrigley
Listed buildings in Bollington
Listed buildings in Prestbury

References
Citations

Sources

 

 

Listed buildings in the Borough of Cheshire East
Lists of listed buildings in Cheshire